Ceratina beata, also known as Ceratina (Xanthoceratina) beata, is a species of bee belonging to the family Apidae, subfamily Xylocopinae.

References

External links
 http://animaldiversity.org/accounts/Ceratina_beata/classification/
 https://www.academia.edu/7390502/AN_UPDATED_CHECKLIST_OF_BEES_OF_SRI_LANKA_WITH_NEW_RECORDS
 https://www.itis.gov/servlet/SingleRpt/SingleRpt?search_topic=TSN&search_value=765391

beata
Insects described in 1897